Nenad Žvanut (born 23 April 1962) is a Croatian speed skater. He competed at the 1984 Winter Olympics and the 1988 Winter Olympics.

References

1962 births
Living people
Croatian male speed skaters
Olympic speed skaters of Yugoslavia
Speed skaters at the 1984 Winter Olympics
Speed skaters at the 1988 Winter Olympics
Sportspeople from Rijeka